Simona is a genus of cicadas in the family Cicadidae. There are at least three described species in Simona.

Species
These three species belong to the genus Simona:
 Simona erema Ewart, Popple & Marshall, 2015 c g
 Simona retracta Ewart, Popple & Marshall, 2015 c g
 Simona sancta (Distant, 1913) c g
Data sources: i = ITIS, c = Catalogue of Life, g = GBIF, b = Bugguide.net

References

Further reading

 
 
 
 

Cicadettini
Cicadidae genera